Anastasiia Pliaskina (born 21 February 1996) is a Russian professional racing cyclist, who currently rides for UCI Women's Continental Team .

References

External links

1996 births
Living people
Russian female cyclists
Place of birth missing (living people)
21st-century Russian women